Jeb Ivey (born November 7, 1980) is an American former professional basketball player. He won the Icelandic championship twice, with Njarðvík in 2006 and with Snæfell in 2010, and the Finnish championship twice, with Nilan Bisons Loimaa in 2012 and 2013 where he was named the Korisliiga Finals MVP both times.

From September 24, 2010 to December 6, 2013 he scored a three pointer in 177 consecutive games, setting a world record according to Guinness World Records.

Career
In 2018, Ivey returned to Njarðvík where he last played 11-years prior. He retired from basketball following Njarðvík's first round loss against ÍR in the 2019 Úrvalsdeild playoffs. In 27 regular season and playoffs games for Njarðvík, Ivey averaged 16.5 points and 5.0 assists per game while shooting 37.8% from the three point range. On April 1, following Njarðvík's first round loss to ÍR, Ivey announced his retirement from professional basketball.

Honours

Finland

Club
 Finnish Champion: 2012, 2013

Individual
 Korisliiga Finals MVP: 2012, 2013
 Korisliiga Foreign Player of the Year: 2012

Iceland

Club
 Icelandic Champion: 2006, 2010
 Icelandic Super Cup: 2006
 Icelandic Company Cup: 2006

Personal life
Ivey is the son of Mitch Ivey, who won bronze in 200 meters backstroke at the 1972 Summer Olympics.

References

External links
Profile at realgm.com
College statistics at sport-reference.com
Finnish statistics at basket.fi
Icelandic statistics 2003-2007 at kki.is
Icelandic statistics 2010-present at kki.is

1980 births
Living people
American men's basketball players
Basketball players from San Jose, California
Junior college men's basketball players in the United States
KTP-Basket players
Njarðvík men's basketball players
Point guards
Portland State Vikings men's basketball players
Snæfell men's basketball players
Úrvalsdeild karla (basketball) players
Vestri men's basketball players
West Valley College alumni